Pata Anjasi (possibly from Quechua pata elevated place; above, at the top; edge;  bank (of a river), shore, anqasi cobalt salt used for dyeing,) is a mountain in the Vilcanota mountain range in the Andes of Peru, about  high. It is located in the Puno Region, Carabaya Province, Corani District. Pata Anjasi is situated east of the large glaciated area of Quelccaya (Quechua for "snow plain") and the peaks of Jatun Quenamari, and southeast of Cuncunani.

References

Mountains of Puno Region
Mountains of Peru